Liselotte Strelow (11 September 1908 – 30 September 1981) was a German photographer.

Life 

Born in Redel, Pommerania, the farmer's daughter went to Berlin in 1930, where she took photography courses at the Lette-Verein school. In 1932, she learned in the studio of the Jewish photographer Suse Byk, after which she was employed by Kodak (Germany). In 1938, she took over 's studio on Kurfürstendamm The studio as well as most of her photo archive were destroyed in a bombing raid in winter 1944.

After fleeing from Pomerania in 1945, she first went to Detmold, and in 1950 she opened a studio on Königsallee in Düsseldorf. She specialised in portrait and theatre photography. Her pictures in collaboration with Gustaf Gründgens and Elisabeth Flickenschildt soon made her famous. After the Deutsche Bundespost chose her portrait of Theodor Heuss as the basis for a series of stamps of the Bundespräsident in 1959, she was able to choose her clients. Her portraits of Konrad Adenauer, Rudolf Augstein, Maria Callas, Uwe Johnson and Thomas Mann as well as Ingeborg Bachmann, Gottfried Benn, Joseph Beuys, Lea Steinwasser, Jean Cocteau, Marlene Dietrich and Hildegard Knef.

Strelow was a member of the Gesellschaft Deutscher Lichtbildner (GDL) and the German Society for Photography (DGPh).

The photographer died in Hamburg at the age of 73.

Prizes 
 1969: David Octavius Hill-Medaille, vergeben durch die Gesellschaft Deutscher Lichtbildner e.V. (GDL); seit 1988 vergeben durch :die Fotografische Akademie GDL, gemeinsam mit der Stadt Leinfelden-Echterdingen als David Octavius Hill Medaille / Kunstpreis der Stadt Leinfelden-Echterdingen
 1976: Kulturpreis of the German Society for Photography (together with Rosemarie Clausen and Regina Relang)

Exhibitions 
 2008/2009: Rheinisches Landesmuseum Bonn.
 2009: Historisches Museum Frankfurt
 2010: Willy-Brandt-Haus, Berlin
 2010: Kunsthalle Erfurt
2019: Liselotte Stresow  BILDERGESCHICHTEN, Johanna Breede PHOTOKUNST

Further reading 
 Liselotte Strelow. Das manipulierte Menschenbildnis oder Die Kunst, fotogen zu sein. Econ, Düsseldorf 1961
 Liselotte Strelow. Portraits 1933–1972 (Exhibition catalogue, Bonn 1977), edited by Klaus Honnef, Cologne 1977, 
 Johanna Wolf-Breede: Liselotte Strelow. Portrait einer Portraitphotographin. Munich 1987, MA - Ludwig-Maximilians-Universität, Munich 1987
 Liselotte Strelow (1908–1981). Erinnerungen (Exhibition catalogue, Bad Bevensen), edited by Detlef Gosselk and Heide Raschke, with texts by Klaus Honnef and Johanna Wolf-Breede, Lüneburg 1989 
 Sidney Darchinger: Gesicht als Ereignis: Liselotte Strelow. Porträtphotographie 1939–1974. Bonn 1997. Diss. Bonn 1994 
 Liselotte Strelow. Momente der Wahrheit – Bilder eines Jahrhunderts. With a text by Marlene Rytlewski, Hinstorff, Rostock 2006, 
 Liselotte Strelow: Retrospektive 1908–1981. Hatje Cantz, Ostfildern 2008,

References

External links 
 
 
www.photo-archiv.info (with the famous Theodor Heuss photo)
 Ausführliche biografische Informationen und Arbeiten, Frauen-Kultur-Archiv der Heinrich-Heine-Universität Düsseldorf

20th-century German photographers
Theatrical photographers
German women photographers
1908 births
1981 deaths
People from Pomerania
20th-century German women